James Almasi is the  current Anglican Bishop of Masasi.

References

Anglican bishops of Masasi
Living people
21st-century Anglican bishops in Tanzania
Year of birth missing (living people)